Mutum is a municipality in the state of Minas Gerais, in Brazil with a population of 26,961 as of 2020 and an area of 1,255.800 km². It was founded on June 17, 1912. The city has two rivers: Mutum and São Manoel.

References

External links
  Mutum City Website

Municipalities in Minas Gerais